Camp Fortune is a commercial alpine ski centre located in the municipality of Chelsea in the Gatineau Hills north of Gatineau, Quebec, approximately fifteen minutes from Downtown Ottawa, Ontario.

Camp Fortune is composed of three mountainsides, including the Valley, Meech, and Skyline. Pineault, Clifford and Alexander are jointly referred to as The Valley and are considered to host the easier slopes of the ski centre. Meech offers intermediate terrain, and Skyline offers advanced terrain.

During the summer, Camp Fortune operates an aerial park with zip lines and offers downhill and cross country mountain biking in addition to a disc golf course. In addition, the ski lodge is available for rent as a banquet venue.

Ryan Tower is a 228.9-metre (750 feet) tall guyed mast that was built in the 1960s, and is located at the summit of the Clifford slope.  A shorter tower of 38 metres (123.5') dating from 1961 was the original antenna support structure for the radio station CFMO-FM. It was taken down on Sunday, November 4, 2012, and its functions were transferred to a new, nearby replacement tower.

Camp Fortune Ski Club  operates at the hill, providing competitive and 'house' ski racing programmes for children and young adults aged 5 to 18 based on the Nancy Greene and Snowstars approaches.

For the 2021 Summer season, Camp Fortune introduced an alpine pipe coaster, accessible from the Valley chairlift that runs from the top of the Clifford slope back to the bottom of the hill. The pipe coaster is approximately 1 kilometer long and riders can reach max speeds of 40 kilometers per hour.

For the 2022 Summer season, Camp Fortune has tentatively announced a peak to peak Zipline experience which features a 3 zipline course that spans 4,478 feet between the Clifford and Axelander slopes and includes an optional 50 foot free fall jump attraction.

Stats 

Vertical  
 Skyline: 180m (590')
 Valley: 110m (360')
 Meech: 156m (512')

Number of runs/trails: 25

Total Number of lifts: 8
 4 Fixed-Grip Quadruple Chairs
 1 Fixed-Grip Triple Quad
 2 Magic Carpets
 1 T-Bar

Snowpark: Yes

See also 
 Mont Ste. Marie
 Mount Pakenham
 Calabogie Peaks
 List of ski areas and resorts in Canada
 Tallest structures in Canada
 List of masts

References

External links 
 Official Website
 Trail Map
 The Weather Network Ski Report
 Diagram of Ryan Tower
 Camp Fortune Ski Club
 Nancy Greene Ski League
 Husky Snowstars

Tourist attractions in Outaouais
Ski areas and resorts in Quebec
Tourist attractions in Ottawa
Disc golf courses in Quebec